Johann Leopold, Hereditary Prince of Saxe-Coburg and Gotha (in German: Johann Leopold William Albert Ferdinand Victor; 2 August 1906 – 4 May 1972) was the eldest son of Charles Edward, Duke of Saxe-Coburg and Gotha, and Princess Victoria Adelaide of Schleswig-Holstein-Sonderburg-Glücksburg.

Early life

Johann Leopold was born 2 August 1906 at Callenberg Castle in Coburg as the eldest son of Charles Edward, Duke of Saxe-Coburg and Gotha, and Princess Victoria Adelaide of Schleswig-Holstein-Sonderburg-Glücksburg.

He was heir-apparent, from his birth, until the forced abdication of his father on 18 November 1918, to Saxe-Coburg and Gotha. The abdication was a result of the German Revolution.

Marriage
Charles Edward hoped to arrange a marriage between Prince Johann Leopold and Princess Juliana, heir presumptive to his first cousin Queen Wilhelmina of the Netherlands. The match never materialized, with Charles Edward blaming his "useless" son.

Johann Leopold's first wife was Feodora Marie Alma Margarete, Baroness von der Horst (1905–1991), who divorced Wolf Sigismund, Baron Pergler von Perglas, in 1931. They married morganatically on 9 March 1932. The prince was forced to cede his own succession rights at the time of the marriage. The couple had three children and were divorced on 27 February 1962. His second wife was Maria Theresa Elizabeth Reindl (1908–1996), whom he married morganatically on 3 May 1963. They had no children.

Issue
The Prince had three children by his first wife, all barred from the succession of the duchy of Saxe-Coburg and Gotha, but not barred from the succession of the United Kingdom nor the Dukedom of Albany.

Ancestry

References

House of Saxe-Coburg and Gotha (United Kingdom)
Princes of Saxe-Coburg and Gotha
1906 births
1972 deaths
People from Coburg
Heirs apparent who never acceded
Sons of monarchs